Lobjanidze is a Georgian surname. Notable people with the surname include:

Elguja Lobjanidze (born 1992), Georgian football player
Movlud Lobjanidze (born 1968), Georgian judoka
Nugzar Lobjanidze (born 1971), Georgian professional football player
Ucha Lobjanidze (born 1987), Georgian footballer 
Surnames of Abkhazian origin

Surnames of Georgian origin
Georgian-language surnames